The third season of the American sitcom The Office premiered in the United States on NBC on September 21, 2006, and concluded on May 17, 2007. The season had a total of 25 half-hours of material, divided into 16 half-hour episodes, five 40-minute "super-sized" episodes, and two one-hour episodes. The Office is an American adaptation of the British TV series of the same name as a mockumentary portraying the daily lives of office employees in the Scranton, Pennsylvania branch of the fictitious Dunder Mifflin Paper Company. The season stars Steve Carell, Rainn Wilson, John Krasinski, Jenna Fischer, and B. J. Novak, with supporting performances from Melora Hardin, David Denman, Ed Helms, Leslie David Baker, Brian Baumgartner, Kate Flannery, Mindy Kaling, Angela Kinsey, Paul Lieberstein, Oscar Nunez, and Phyllis Smith.

The season marked the move of main character Jim Halpert (John Krasinski) from Scranton to Stamford, and also introduced Rashida Jones as Karen Filippelli, and Ed Helms as Andy Bernard—both members of Dunder Mifflin Stamford—as recurring characters. Helms would later be promoted to series regular. The main plot for the early episodes of the season deals with a recurring problem in seasons one and two—the problem of company downsizing—while in the last half of the season, intra-office relationships (specifically those among Pam, Jim, and Karen; Dwight and Angela; and Michael and Jan Levinson) also become major plot points.

The third season of The Office aired on Thursdays at 8:30 p.m. (ET). The season saw its ratings increase from the previous. In addition, it continued the critical praise that had started during the show's second season. The season was released on DVD in a box set containing four discs. While the DVD features all 25 episodes, the episodes "Traveling Salesmen" and "The Return" were condensed into one episode. The set contained commentaries from creators, writers, actors, and directors on some of the episodes, while also containing deleted scenes from all of the episodes. It was released by Universal Studios Home Entertainment.

Production 

The third season of the show was produced by Reveille Productions and Deedle-Dee Productions, both in association with NBC Universal Television Studios. The show is based on the British series created by Ricky Gervais and Stephen Merchant, who are executive producers on the show and wrote the third-season episode "The Convict". The Office is produced by Greg Daniels, who is also executive producer and show runner. Returning writers from last season include Daniels, Michael Schur, Gene Stupnitsky, Lee Eisenberg, Jennifer Celotta, Mindy Kaling, Paul Lieberstein, and B. J. Novak. Joining the writing staff for the second season are Brent Forrester, Justin Spitzer, and Caroline Williams.

Season three featured episodes directed by twelve different directors. Ken Kwapis, Ken Whittingham, Daniels, Randall Einhorn, Tucker Gates, Jeffrey Blitz, and Harold Ramis all directed multiple episodes. The remained only directed one episode for the season. Gordon, Kwapis, Whittingham, and Daniels had all previously directed episodes during seasons one and two. The season also featured guest directing courtesy of Joss Whedon and J. J. Abrams. While The Office was mainly filmed on a studio set at Valley Center Studios in Van Nuys, California, the city of Scranton, Pennsylvania, where the show is set, was also used for shots of the opening theme. 

The series was renewed before the airing of the second-season episode "The Carpet". Series star Jenna Fischer noted that "It is rare in this business to hear news of a pickup so early", but that NBC was very pleased with how well the show was doing. It had previously, and erroneously, been advertised that the show would finish its run at the end of March 2006. Fischer later explained that while the season would end—actually in May—the show would continue.

Season overview 
Notable ongoing subplots from the third season and beyond include:

 Jim Halpert's transfer to the Dunder Mifflin Stamford branch
 Michael Scott's up-and-down relationship with Jan Levinson
 The introduction of Stamford-based employees Andy Bernard and Karen Filippelli
 Pam Beesly calling off her wedding to Roy Anderson
 The closing of the Stamford branch and subsequent merger with Scranton
 Jim's new romance with Karen Filippelli
 Ryan Howard's promotion to salesman
 Dwight Schrute competing with Andy to be Michael's right-hand man
 David Wallace's search for a new Vice President of Sales

Cast 

The Office employs an ensemble cast. All of the main characters, and some minor ones, are based on characters from the British version of The Office. While these characters normally have the same attitudes and perceptions as their British counterparts, the roles have been redesigned to better fit the American show. The show is known for its large cast size, many of whom are known particularly for their improvisational work.

Main
 Steve Carell as Michael Scott, Regional Manager of the Dunder Mifflin Scranton Branch. Loosely based on David Brent, Gervais' character in the British version, Scott is a dim-witted and lonely man, who attempts to win friends as the office comedian, usually making himself look bad in the process. 
 Rainn Wilson as Dwight Schrute, who, based upon Gareth Keenan, is the Assistant to the Regional Manager, although the character frequently fails to include "to the" in his title. 
 John Krasinski as Jim Halpert, a sales representative and prankster, who is based upon Tim Canterbury, and is in love with Pam Beesly, the receptionist. 
 Jenna Fischer as Pam Beesly, who is based on Dawn Tinsley. She is shy, but is often a cohort with Jim in his pranks on Dwight. 
 B. J. Novak as Ryan Howard, who for the first two seasons is a temporary worker, but is promoted to sales representative in this season.

Starring
 Melora Hardin as Jan Levinson, Michael's boss and love interest.
 David Denman as Roy Anderson, Pam's ex-fiancé and a warehouse worker.
 Ed Helms as Andy Bernard, a preppy salesman with anger issues, who is transferred from the Stamford branch.
 Leslie David Baker as Stanley Hudson, a grumpy salesman.
 Brian Baumgartner as Kevin Malone, a dim-witted accountant, who is based on Keith Bishop.
 Kate Flannery as Meredith Palmer, a promiscuous supplier relations representative.
 Mindy Kaling as Kelly Kapoor, the shallow and talkative customer service representative.
 Angela Kinsey as Angela Martin, a judgemental accountant, who serves as Dwight's love interest.
 Paul Lieberstein as Toby Flenderson, the sad-eyed human resources representative.
 Oscar Nunez as Oscar Martinez, an intelligent accountant, who is also gay.
 Phyllis Smith as Phyllis Vance, a motherly saleswoman.

Recurring
 Rashida Jones as Karen Filippelli, a saleswoman transferred from the Stamford branch, who serves as Jim's new love interest.
 Creed Bratton as Creed Bratton, the office's strange quality assurance officer.
 Craig Robinson as Darryl Philbin, the warehouse supervisor.
 Andy Buckley as David Wallace, Dunder Mifflin's CFO.

Reception

Ratings

The third-season premiere "Gay Witch Hunt" received a 5.7/9 in the Nielsen ratings, meaning that on average 5.7 percent of households were tuned in at any given moment and 9 percent of all televisions in use at the time were tuned into the program. The premiere was watched by 9.1 million viewers, and marked a slight increase from the second season premiere "The Dundies". At the onset of the season, the show began to eclipse the viewership of its lead-in program, My Name Is Earl. The season hit a low with the nineteenth episode "The Negotiation", which was viewed by 6.74 million viewers. The season finale, "The Job" was viewed by 7.88 million viewers, also an increase from the second-season finale "Casino Night". By the end of the 2006–07 season, it placed 68th, a one-place slip from the previous season. Despite this, the show's third season was slightly more watched than the previous: it averaged 8.3 million viewers, and scored a 4.1/11 in the Nielsen ratings, meaning that on average 4.1 percent of households 18–49 years old were tuned in at any given moment and 11 percent of all televisions in use at the time were tuned into the program. The series also ranked as the 28th-most watched series in the 18–49 demographic.

Reviews
The third season of The Office was met with critical acclaim. Review aggregator website Metacritic gave the third season of the show an 85 out of 100 rating, which translates to the status of "universal acclaim". Travis Fickett of IGN felt that "In its third season The Office continued to be one of the smartest, funniest and most likable shows on television." Entertainment Weekly writer Meeta Agrawal praised the show for separating the action between Jim in Stamford and the rest of the characters in Scranton, a feat that he notes "could have been disastrous" to other shows. Furthermore, he argued that the effort made the audience "appreciate [the characters] even more". Ultimately, he gave the season an "A−". Francis Rizzo III of DVD Talk called the season "an outstanding year for the Scranton crew" and praised the "unbelievably funny 21 episodes in between" the opener and the finale as reasons as to why it was "a great stand-alone season from easily one of the funniest shows on TV."

The third season was the first season to feature hour-long episodes, with "A Benihana Christmas" and "The Job". While the following season would be criticized for its overuse of hour-long episodes, both of season three's longer episodes received favorable reception. While season three did indeed feature mainstream songs in its soundtrack, many of the songs were decades old. Daniels later explained that "our songs are not about the show's identity as a whole. Each song reflects personal elements of a character, or the emotions of the character at the time."

Awards 
The third season of The Office received seven nominations for Primetime Emmys at the 59th Primetime Emmy Awards, and won the award for Outstanding Writing for a Comedy Series for the episode "Gay Witch Hunt", as well as the award for Outstanding Single-camera Picture Editing For A Comedy Series for the episode "The Job". The Office was also nominated for the Emmy for Outstanding Comedy Series, with the award going to 30 Rock. Other nominations included Outstanding Lead Actor in a Comedy Series for Steve Carell for his portrayal of Michael Scott, Outstanding Supporting Actor for Rainn Wilson for his portrayal of Dwight Schrute, Outstanding Supporting Actress for Jenna Fischer for her portrayal of Pam Beesly, Outstanding Directing for a Comedy Series for Ken Kwapis for directing the episode "Gay Witch Hunt", and another nomination for Outstanding Writing for a Comedy Series for Michael Schur for the episode "The Negotiation".

Episodes 

In the following table, "U.S. viewers (million)" refers to the number of Americans who viewed the episode on the night of broadcast. Episodes are listed by the order in which they aired, and may not necessarily correspond to their production codes.

 denotes a "super-sized" 40-minute episode (with advertisements; actual runtime around 28 minutes).
 denotes an hour-long episode (with advertisements; actual runtime around 42 minutes).

DVD release

References

External links 
 
 

 
2006 American television seasons
2007 American television seasons